Kshanti  (Sanskrit ) or khanti (Pāli) is patience, forbearance and forgiveness. It is one of the pāramitās in both Theravāda and Mahāyāna Buddhism.

Canonical sources
Examples in the Pāli canon identify using forbearance in response to others' anger, cuckolding, torture and even fatal assaults.

Dhammapada verses
Khanti is the first word of the Ovada-Patimokkha Gatha (Pāli for "Patimokkha Exhortation Verse"), also found in the Dhammapada, verse 184:

Elsewhere in the Dhammapada khanti is found in verse 399:

Lord Sakka's restraint
In the Samyutta Nikaya, the Buddha tells of an ancient battle between devas and asuras during which the devas were victorious and the asura king Vepacitti was captured and imprisoned.  When the deva lord, Sakka visited Vepacitti in prison, Vepacitti "abused and reviled him with rude, harsh words," to which Sakka did not respond in kind.  Afterwards, Sakka's charioteer questioned Sakka about this, expressing concern that some would see Sakka's response as indicative of fear or weakness.  Sakka replied:

The Buddha then commended to his followers Sakka's praise for "patience and gentleness" (khantisoraccassa).

A cuckold's forbearance
In a Jātaka tale, Exposition on Patience Birth Story (: J 225), the Buddha tells of a former life when he was Brahmadatta, a king of Benares.  At the time, a courtier of the king "fell into an intrigue in the king's harem."  This same courtier was being similarly betrayed by one of his own servants and complained to the king about that servant. In response, the king disclosed his knowledge of the courtier's betrayal and stated: 

Shamed by the king's awareness of their deeds, the courtier and his servant henceforth ceased their betrayals.

Parables of torture
The Majjhima Nikaya has a classic parable of Buddhist forbearance, the Buddha's Simile of the Saw:

Monks, even if bandits were to carve you up savagely, limb by limb, with a two-handled saw, he among you who let his heart get angered even at that would not be doing my bidding. Even then you should train yourselves: "Our minds will be unaffected and we will say no evil words. We will remain sympathetic, with a mind of good will, and with no inner hate. We will keep pervading these people with an awareness imbued with good will and, beginning with them, we will keep pervading the all-encompassing world with an awareness imbued with good will—abundant, expansive, immeasurable, free from hostility, free from ill will." That's how you should train yourselves.

Similarly, in the Jātaka Tale, Patience Teacher Birth Story (Khantivādī Jātaka: J 313), a jealous king repeatedly asked an ascetic what the ascetic taught, to which the ascetic replied, "Patience," which the ascetic further defined as "not to get angry when injured, criticized or struck."  To test the ascetic's patience, the king had the ascetic struck two thousand times with a whip of thorns, had the ascetic's hands and feet axed off, cut off the ascetic's nose and ears, and then kicked the ascetic in the heart. After the king left, the ascetic wished the king a long life and said, "Those like myself do not feel wrath."  The ascetic died later that day.

Citations

General sources 
 Bodhi, Bhikkhu (trans.) (2000). Somerville, MA: Wisdom Publications. .
 Dhammayut Order in the United States of America (1994). A Chanting Guide. Retrieved 3 Jul 2007 from "Access to Insight" at 
 Nandisena, Bhikkhu (2000). Khantivadi Jataka (J 313).
 Rhys Davids, T.W. & William Stede (eds.) (1921-5). The Pali Text Society’s Pali–English Dictionary. Chipstead: Pali Text Society. A general on-line search engine for this dictionary is available at http://dsal.uchicago.edu/dictionaries/pali/.
 Rouse, W.H.D. (trans.) and E.B. Cowell (ed.) (1895, 2006). The Jātaka or Stories of the Buddha's Former Births (Vol. II). Cambridge: Cambridge University Press. Retrieved 4 Jul 2007 from "The Internet Sacred Text Archive" at http://www.sacred-texts.com/bud/j2/index.htm.
 Thanissaro Bhikkhu (trans.) (1997a). Brahmanavagga: Brahmans (Dhp XXVI). Retrieved 3 Jul 2007 from "Access to Insight" at http://www.accesstoinsight.org/tipitaka/kn/dhp/dhp.26.than.html. 
 Thanissaro Bhikkhu (trans.) (1997b). Buddhavagga: Awakened (Dhp XIV). Retrieved 3 Jul 2007 from "Access to Insight" at   
 Thanissaro Bhikkhu (trans.) (1997c). Kakacupama Sutta: The Simile of the Saw (excerpt) (MN 21). Retrieved 3 Jul 2007 from "Access to Insight" at http://www.accesstoinsight.org/tipitaka/mn/mn.021x.than.html.

External links 
 "The Antidote to Snakebite: Talk one of six on patience or kshanti (transcribed talk), by FWBO's Ratnaghosa

Sanskrit words and phrases
Wholesome factors in Buddhism